The 2008 Montreal Alouettes season was the 42nd season for the team in the Canadian Football League and their 56th overall. The Alouettes finished first place in the East Division, won the East Final and advanced to the 96th Grey Cup in Montreal, where they lost to the Calgary Stampeders.

Offseason
The CFL announced on Monday, April 28, the Alouettes exceeded last year's $4.05-million cap by $108,285 and have been fined $116,570 as a result. Montreal was more than $100,000 over, therefore, it will also lose the fourth overall selection in Wednesday's Canadian college draft. Montreal will now be relegated to just one selection in the first-round, coming at No. 7.

CFL draft
In the 2008 CFL Draft, 48 players were chosen from among 752 eligible players from Canadian universities across the country, as well as Canadian players playing in the NCAA. The first two rounds were broadcast on TSN.ca with host Rod Black.

Preseason

Regular season
 On October 4, Montreal Alouettes slotback, Ben Cahoon surpassed Ray Elgaard to become the leading Canadian receiver in CFL history, with 831 receptions, against the Hamilton Tiger Cats.

Season standings

Season schedule

 Games played with colour uniforms.
 Games played with white uniforms.
 Games played with alternate uniforms.

Roster

Statistics

Offence

Passing

Rushing

Receiving

Defence

Playoffs

Eastern Final
Date and time: Saturday, November 15, 1:00 PM Eastern Standard TimeVenue: Olympic Stadium, Montreal, Quebec

Grey Cup
Date and time: Sunday, November 23, 6:00 PM Eastern Standard TimeVenue: Olympic Stadium, Montreal, Quebec

Awards and records
 Ben Cahoon, Nominee, Outstanding Canadian Award
 Anthony Calvillo, Led Eastern Division, Passing Yards (5,624)
 Anthony Calvillo, Led CFL, Passing Attempts (682)
 Anthony Calvillo, Led CFL, Passing Completions (472)
 Anthony Calvillo, Led Eastern Division, Passing Completion (69.8%)
 Anthony Calvillo, Led CFL, Passing Touchdowns (43)
 Anthony Calvillo, Led CFL, Passer Rating (107.2) 
CFL's Most Outstanding Player Award – Anthony Calvillo (QB), Montreal Alouettes
 Avon Cobourne, Led CFL Eastern Division, Rushing Yards, (950)
CFL's Most Outstanding Offensive Lineman Award – Scott Flory (OG), Montreal Alouettes
Terry Evanshen Trophy, Anthony Calvillo

All-Star Selections
 Josh Bourke, Eastern Division All-Star, Offence
 Anthony Calvillo, Eastern Division All-Star, Offence
 Bryan Chiu, Eastern Division All-Star, Offence
 Avon Cobourne, Eastern Division All-Star, Offence
 Damon Duval, CFL Eastern All-Star, Special Teams
 Mark Estelle, CFL Eastern All-Star, Defence
 Scott Flory, Eastern Division All-Star, Offence
 T.J. Hill, CFL Eastern All-Star, Defence
 Paul Lambert, Eastern Division All-Star, Offence
Jamel Richardson, Eastern Division All-Star, Offence
 Davis Sanchez, CFL Eastern All-Star, Defence
Kerry Watkins, Eastern Division All-Star, Offence
 Keron Williams, CFL Eastern All-Star, Defence

Milestones

References

Montreal Alouettes
Montreal Alouettes seasons